Allom is a surname. Notable people with the surname include:

Tom Allom, English sound engineer and record producer
Thomas Allom (1804–1872), English architect, artist, and topographical illustrator
Sir Charles Carrick Allom (1865–1947), British decorator 
Maurice James Carrick Allom (1906-1995), English cricketer
Anthony Allom (born 1938), English cricketer

See also
Allom Cup